King Cynfyn (died c. 615) was the King of Ergyng, a kingdom of south-east Wales in the early medieval period. He was the son of Peibio Clafrog.

Life
Little is known of Cynfyn ap Peibio apart from the evidence of later medieval genealogies. He appears a number of times in the Llandaff Charters, particularly in association with Bishop Aeddan and Bishop Elwystl.

References

6th-century births
615 deaths
Monarchs of Ergyng
6th-century Welsh monarchs
7th-century Welsh monarchs
6th-century Welsh people